The 2001-02 Luxembourg Championship season was the sixth season of Luxembourg's hockey league. Three teams participated in the league, and Tornado Luxembourg won the championship.

Final ranking

External links
Season on hockeyarchives.info

Luxembourg Championship
Luxembourg Championship (ice hockey) seasons